The 1995 Puerto Rico Open was a women's tennis tournament played on outdoor hard courts at the San Juan Central Park in San Juan in Puerto Rico that was part of Tier III of the 1995 WTA Tour. It was the twelfth edition of the tournament and was held from February 27 through March 5, 1995. Unseeded Joannette Kruger won the singles title.

Finals

Singles

 Joannette Kruger defeated  Kyoko Nagatsuka 7–6, 6–3
 It was Kruger's only title of the year and the 1st of her career.

Doubles

 Karin Kschwendt /  Rene Simpson defeated  Laura Golarsa /  Linda Harvey-Wild 6–2, 0–6, 6–4
 It was Kschwendt's only title of the year and the 6th of her career. It was Simpson's 1st title of the year and the 2nd of her career.

References

External links
 ITF tournament edition details
 Tournament draws

Puerto Rico Open
Puerto Rico Open (tennis)
Puerto Rico Open, 1995